Ricardo Viveros may refer to:

 Ricardo Viveros (footballer, born 1975), Chilean football manager and former forward
 Ricardo Viveros (footballer, born 1978), Chilean football forward and left-back